Conyzicola nivalis Gram-positive, psychrophilic, rod-shaped and non-motile bacterium from the genus of Conyzicola which has been isolated from snow from the Zadang Glacier from the Tibetan Plateau.

References

Microbacteriaceae
Bacteria described in 2017